The Doom Generation is a 1995 black comedy thriller film written and directed by Gregg Araki. The film follows two troubled teenage lovers, Amy Blue (Rose McGowan) and Jordan White (James Duval), who pick up a young handsome drifter named Xavier Red (Johnathon Schaech). After Xavier accidentally kills a store clerk, the trio embarks on a journey full of sex, violence, and people from Amy's past. Billed as "A Heterosexual Movie by Gregg Araki", The Doom Generation is the second film in the director's trilogy known as the Teenage Apocalypse film trilogy, the first being Totally Fucked Up (1993) and the last one Nowhere (1997). The characters of Amy Blue and Jordan White are based on the Mark Beyer comic strip "Amy and Jordan".

The Doom Generation was Araki's major film debut. It was shot mostly at night during January 1994 in Los Angeles on a budget of $800,000. The crew avoided well known landmarks and shot in undeveloped areas of urban sprawl to give the film an apocalyptic feel. The budget allowed Araki to hire professional crew, making it the first of his films not shot by himself.

The film premiered at the Sundance Film Festival on January 26, 1995, before appearing at various other film festivals. It received mixed reviews from critics. During the press screening, many of the critics walked out. However, at the San Francisco International Film Festival (SFIFF), the film received critical acclaim, most proclaiming it as Araki's breakthrough film. Distributed by Trimark Pictures, it was released in the United States on October 27, 1995. The film was not a financial success, earning only $284,785 at the box office. McGowan was nominated for the Best Debut Performance at the 11th Independent Spirit Awards.

Plot
Teenage lovers Jordan White and Amy Blue pick up a handsome drifter named Xavier Red while driving home from a club. Jordan gives Xavier the nickname "X". A late-night stop at a convenience store leaves the three on the run when X accidentally kills the store's owner, forcing the trio to hide in a motel to avoid arrest. Jordan and Amy have sex in the bathtub, while X watches from an outside window. X then learns from the local television news program that the store owner's wife disemboweled her children with a machete before committing suicide. This leads X to believe that the trio won't be considered suspects or be found by police.

Later that evening, Amy has sex with X, despite their mutual dislike of each other. Eventually Jordan finds out, and things become tense as the two men develop a lingering sexual attraction for one another. As the trio journeys around the city of Los Angeles, they continue to get into violent (almost comedic; every item the trio buys always comes out to $6.66) situations due to people either claiming to be Amy's previous lovers or mistaking her for such. These incidents get the attention of the FBI, and their goal is to find Amy and kill her (exactly the same sentiment is voiced by several other parties in the film). She is mistakenly identified by a fast food window clerk as "Sunshine" and later by a character played by Parker Posey as "Kitten".

Jordan, Amy and X spend the night in an abandoned warehouse, where they engage in a threesome. While Amy goes to urinate, Jordan and X are attacked by a trio of neo-Nazis, one of whom had previously mistaken Amy for his ex-girlfriend "Bambi". The gang first severely beats up X, then holds Jordan down as the aforementioned neo-Nazi ties up and rapes Amy on top of an American flag. The group finally cuts off Jordan's penis with pruning shears and forces the severed penis into his mouth. After Amy breaks free, she kills the neo-Nazis with the shears and escapes with X, leaving Jordan for dead. The film ends with Amy and X driving in her car. X offers Amy a Dorito, to no reply. Aimless on an empty road, the credits roll.

Cast

Release

Critical reception
The Doom Generation received mixed reviews, with critics often comparing the film both favorably and unfavorably to Oliver Stone's Natural Born Killers. Film review aggregation website Rotten Tomatoes, gives the film a score of 49% based on 35 reviews. Giving the film its very first review, in Variety, Emanuel Levy noted: "Stylishly yet personally expressive, “The Doom Generation” marks an innovative turning point in Araki’s career." Roger Ebert famously gave the film "zero stars" and wrote, "Note carefully that I do not object to the content of his movie, but to the attitude." Ricky da Conceição of Sound on Sight named the film the best of Araki's "Teenage Apocalypse Trilogy" and said it "represented a major artistic leap forward" for Araki, who "creates a twisted pastiche of science fiction, nihilistic road movie and teen angst filtered with dead pan comedy and his own unique commentary on the depravity of modern America." He praised the set design, lighting, score and actress Rose McGowan, who "steals the show as the foul mouthed, morally aimless femme fatale on crystal meth and Diet Coke."

Home media
In March 2012, the UK company Second Sight Films released a DVD with anamorphic widescreen and director/cast commentary. Previous releases up until this point lacked the commentary, with many lacking the widescreen format.

Director's Cut 
The first cut of The Doom Generation shown at Sundance featured several scenes which were cut from future releases. This original cut was shown at the 2023 Sundance Film Festival, restored in 4k with 5.1 surround sound. This version will be released in cinemas around the US, starting April 6 at BAM as part of NewFest’s upcoming series “Queering the Canon: Totally Radical”.

References

External links
 
 
 

1995 films
1995 comedy films
1995 crime thriller films
1995 independent films
1995 LGBT-related films
1995 thriller films
1990s black comedy films
1990s comedy road movies
1990s comedy thriller films
1990s crime comedy films
1990s English-language films
1990s teen comedy films
American black comedy films
American comedy road movies
American comedy thriller films
American crime comedy films
American crime thriller films
American independent films
American teen comedy films
American teen LGBT-related films
Bisexuality-related films
English-language French films
Filicide in fiction
Films directed by Gregg Araki
Films produced by Andrea Sperling
Films set in Los Angeles
Films shot in Los Angeles
French black comedy films
French comedy road movies
French crime comedy films
French crime thriller films
French independent films
French LGBT-related films
French teen films
LGBT-related black comedy films
LGBT-related thriller films
Teen crime films
Teen thriller films
Trimark Pictures films
1990s American films
1990s French films